Everybody's Autobiography is a book by Gertrude Stein, published in 1937. 

It is a continuation of her own memoirs, picking up where The Autobiography of Alice B. Toklas, published in 1933, left off. Both were written in a less experimental, more approachable style than most of her other work. 
 

In chapter four of this book is found the famous quote "There is no there there" which refers to her disappeared childhood home in Oakland, California.

References

Books by Gertrude Stein
1937 non-fiction books
Culture of Oakland, California
Books about the San Francisco Bay Area